The Dark Glow of the Mountains is a TV documentary made in 1985 by German filmmaker Werner Herzog.  It is about an expedition made by mountain climber Reinhold Messner and his partner Hans Kammerlander to climb Gasherbrum II and Gasherbrum I all in one trip without returning to base camp.  The film is not so much concerned with showing the climb itself or giving guidelines on mountaineering, but seeks to reveal the inner motivation of the climbers.

References

External links 
 
 Senses of Cinema article on Dark Glow of the Mountains

1985 films
1985 television films
German documentary television films
West German films
1980s German-language films
German-language television shows
Documentary films about climbing
1985 documentary films
Films directed by Werner Herzog
1980s German films